Jay Penske is an American media and publishing entrepreneur and auto racing team owner. He is the Chairman and CEO of Penske Media Corporation, a digital media and publishing company he founded in 2004.

Early life and education
Born on May 5th, 1979 in New York City, New York, Penske is the youngest son of Kathy, an English teacher and Roger Penske, founder of the automotive conglomerate Penske Corporation and a former race car driver. Penske graduated from high school at St. Mary's Preparatory, in the Detroit suburb of Orchard Lake Village in Michigan, after having attended Cranbrook and Lawrenceville.

At St. Mary's, Penske was named All-League, All-State, All-American, and Player of the Year by USA Today in lacrosse. Penske also played hockey and earned All-Region and All-State honors. In 1997, he set the school records for the most goals, assists, and total points in lacrosse in the school's history, after which they retired his number in the school gymnasium. During his final season of lacrosse Penske broke Michael Powell's record of 194 points with 202 points in a single season. He remains the only player in lacrosse history to average more than 10 points per game, and break the 200-point barrier in a single season.

Penske graduated from the University of Pennsylvania's Wharton School with a Bachelor of Science in Management of Information Systems and Finance. He is on the board of the Entrepreneurial School at the Wharton School as of 2007, and is also a member of the University of Pennsylvania Library's Board of Directors.

Career

Media and publishing

Penske co-founded Firefly Mobile, Inc., a wireless company that developed the Firefly mobile phone for children, and other youth targeted mobile products. The Firefly phone won the 2006 CES Innovation Award, presented by the Consumer Electronics Association (CEA) and the 2006 International Consumer Electronics Show (CES). Penske also owns Dragon Books, Ltd., a Los Angeles-based used bookstore which sells rare and collectible books which opened for business in 1999.

Penske is the Chairman and CEO of Penske Media Corporation (PMC), a digital media and publishing company that owns and operates a number of media brands, data services, and live events, including Rolling Stone, Variety, Billboard, and South by Southwest festival (SXSW). Prior to being named Penske Media Corporation, it began as an affinity marketing and internet services company called Velocity Services, Inc. The company acquired the Mail.com domain which was renamed to the Mail.com Media Corporation (MMC).

Motorsports
Penske was co-owner of IndyCar Series racing team Dragon Racing, jointly with Steve Luczo, the Chairman of Seagate Technologies. Raphael Matos won rookie of the year honors in 2009. The team name is derived from Penske's love of books and business interest Dragon Books, Ltd., and his partner's last name.  For 2010, Penske's racing team had former Indy Lights champion Raphael Matos behind the wheel of the HP #2 car for the full Indycar Series circuit of events.  In 2011, the name of the team changed to Dragon Racing, with Penske as the sole owner, and Paul Tracy was announced as the driver. In 2012 the team planned to run Lotus engines with a two-car team composed of Sébastien Bourdais and Katherine Legge. Due to issues with the Lotus engines  Dragon Racing switched to Chevrolet for the Indy 500.  Dragon Racing's drivers for the 2013 season were Sebastián Saavedra and Sébastien Bourdais.

In October 2013, Dragon Racing signed an agreement with Formula E Holdings to be the fourth franchise team to enter the new FIA Formula E Championship. The team was runner-up in the 2014-15 season with drivers Jérôme d'Ambrosio (who ranked fourth), Oriol Servià, and Loïc Duval. In the 2015-16 season, d'Ambrosio was fifth and Duval eight.

Philanthropy
Penske assists the charitable trust organization the Paley Center for Media, where he sits on the Board of Directors. Penske was added to the Paley Board in 2015 along with Yannick Bollore, Chairman and CEO, Havas and Devin Wenig, the CEO of eBay. Furthermore, Penske's racing team, Dragon Racing has donated over $250,000 of its race proceeds—to benefit the charities and non-profit organizations founded by Baron Davis, Tony Dungy, John Elway, Wayne Gretzky, Marcus Allen, Jackson Browne, Brandi Chastain, Ronnie Lott, Jonny Moseley, Chris Mullin, Kerri Walsh and Kristi Yamaguchi.

Recognition and awards
Under Penske's leadership, PMC was awarded as one of North America's top 100 private companies by Herring Research.
He was additionally recognized repeatedly as both a 30 Under 30 and Under 40 Success Story from his alma mater. Penske was also added to Vanity Fair'''s New Establishment list, and in 2010 the magazine named Penske one of the 10 best dressed men in the world in their "International Best-Dressed List" of that year. Additionally he has been named a Vice Chair of the American Film Institute (AFI) in 2014 and in 2015 was named by the NY Observer'' newspaper as one of the 25 most powerful people in Los Angeles.

Personal life 
He became engaged to Elaine Irwin, the model and former wife of musician John Mellencamp, in October 2012. Their daughter was born in 2013.

References

External links
 PMC official website
 Dragon Racing official website
 Dragon Books official website
 Firefly Mobile official website

Living people
Businesspeople from New York City
Businesspeople from Los Angeles
American mass media owners
IndyCar Series team owners
Philanthropists from New York (state)
Formula E team owners
Wharton School of the University of Pennsylvania alumni
Cranbrook Educational Community alumni
Lawrenceville School alumni
Variety (magazine) people
Year of birth missing (living people)
Penske Media Corporation
St. Mary's Preparatory alumni
American people of German descent